1920 The Wrekin by-election was held on 20 November 1920.  The by-election was held due to the death of the incumbent Independent Parliamentary Group MP, Charles Palmer.  It was won by the Independent Parliamentary Group candidate, 59-year old retired Major-General Sir Charles Townshend, who was against the current Unionist-Liberal coalition government and beat Charles Duncan, 55-year old Labour candidate and former MP.

References

1920 elections in the United Kingdom
1920 in England
20th century in Shropshire
Telford and Wrekin
By-elections to the Parliament of the United Kingdom in Shropshire constituencies